In combinatorial mathematics, the necklace polynomial, or Moreau's necklace-counting function,  introduced by , counts the number of distinct necklaces of n colored beads chosen out of α available colors. The necklaces are assumed to be aperiodic (not consisting of repeated subsequences), and counted up to rotation (rotating the beads around the necklace counts as the same necklace), but without flipping over (reversing the order of the beads counts as a different necklace). This counting function also describes, among other things, the dimensions in a free Lie algebra and the number of irreducible polynomials over a finite field.

Definition
The necklace polynomials are a family of polynomials   in the variable  such that

By Möbius inversion they are given by
 
where  is the classic Möbius function. 

A closely related family, called the general necklace polynomial or general necklace-counting function, is:

where  is Euler's totient function.

Applications
The necklace polynomials  appear as:
 The number of aperiodic necklaces (or equivalently Lyndon words) which can be made by arranging n colored beads having α available colors. Two such necklaces are considered equal if they are related by a rotation (but not a reflection). Aperiodic refers to necklaces without rotational symmetry, having n distinct rotations.  The polynomials  give the number of necklaces including the periodic ones: this is easily computed using Pólya theory.
 The dimension of the degree n piece of the free Lie algebra on α generators ("Witt's formula"). Here  should be the dimension of the degree n piece of the corresponding free Jordan algebra.
 The number of distinct words of length n in a Hall set. Note that the Hall set provides an explicit basis for a free Lie algebra; thus, this is the generalized setting for the above.
 The number of monic irreducible polynomials of degree n over a finite field with α elements (when  is a prime power). Here  is the number of polynomials which are primary (a power of an irreducible).
 The exponent in the cyclotomic identity.

Although these various types of objects are all counted by the same polynomial, their precise relationships remain mysterious or unknown. For example, there is no canonical bijection between the irreducible polynomials and the Lyndon words. However, there is a non-canonical bijection that can be constructed as follows. For any degree n monic irreducible polynomial over a field F with α elements, its roots lie in a Galois extension field L with  elements. One may choose an element  such that  is an F-basis for L (a normal basis), where σ is the Frobenius automorphism . Then the bijection can be defined by taking a necklace, viewed as an equivalence class of functions , to the irreducible polynomial , where .

Relations between M and N
The polynomials for M and N are easily related in terms of Dirichlet convolution of arithmetic functions , regarding  as a constant.
 The formula for M gives ,
 The formula for N gives .
 Their relation gives   or equivalently , since n is completely multiplicative.

Any two of these imply the third, for example:

by cancellation in the Dirichlet algebra.

Examples
 

For , starting with length zero, these form the integer sequence
1, 2, 1, 2, 3, 6, 9, 18, 30, 56, 99, 186, 335, ...

Identities

The polynomials obey various combinatorial identities, given by Metropolis & Rota:

where "gcd" is greatest common divisor and "lcm" is least common multiple.  More generally,

which also implies:

Cyclotomic identity

References

 
 
 

Combinatorics on words
Enumerative combinatorics